Baltra Island (Spanish: Isla Baltra), is a small island of the Galápagos Islands. Also known as South Seymour (named after Lord Hugh Seymour), Baltra is a small flat island located near the center of the Galápagos. It was created by geological uplift. The island is very arid and vegetation consists of salt bushes, prickly pear cactus and palo santo trees.

The origin of the name "Baltra" is unknown. "Baltra" is a Spanish surname (particularly Chilean), so it is presumably named after a person. The name is first found in print in the 1927 edition of the South America Pilot by the British Admiralty; it was added after the 1915 edition, but the document explaining the source has been lost. The name is sometimes incorrectly believed to be an acronym used by the US military, though the term predates the US base.

Airport

During World War II, Baltra was established as a United States Army Air Force base. Crews stationed at Baltra patrolled the eastern Pacific for enemy submarines and protected the Panama Canal.

After the war, the facilities were given to the government of Ecuador. Today the island continues as an official Ecuadorian military base. The foundations of buildings and other remains of the US base including the old airfield can still be seen on the island.

Until 1986, Seymour Airport was the only airport serving the Galápagos. Now, two airports receive flights from the continent, the other being San Cristóbal Airport on San Cristóbal Island. Private planes flying to the islands must fly to Baltra as it is the only airport with overnight facilities for planes.

On arriving at Baltra, all visitors are driven by bus to one of two docks. The first dock is located in a small bay where the boats cruising the Galápagos await passengers. The second is a ferry dock, which connects Baltra to the island of Santa Cruz via the Itabaca Channel.

Construction for a larger, modernized airport began in 2011 and was operating by 2013. The new airport is being run under a 15-year concession by ECOGAL, a subsidiary of the Argentinian group Corporación América and has been promoted as "the first ecological airport worldwide" due to its reduced energy consumption for lighting and ventilation, rainwater recovery, waste recycling, etc.

Wildlife

Baltra is not within the boundaries of the Galápagos National Park. The Galápagos land iguana is the subject of an active re-introduction campaign on the island; they became extinct on Baltra in 1954. However, in the early 1930s, Captain G. Allan Hancock had translocated a population of Galápagos land iguanas from Baltra to North Seymour Island, a smaller island just a few hundred meters north of Baltra. The iguanas survived and became the breeding stock for the successful Charles Darwin Research Station captive breeding program. During the 1980s, iguanas from North Seymour were brought to the Darwin Research Station as part of this project, and, in the 1990s, land iguanas were reintroduced to Baltra. As of 1997, scientists counted 97 iguanas living on strict Baltra, 13 of which were born on the islands. It is not uncommon to see iguanas either crossing the main road or on the runway at the airport.

References

External links

 Baltra Information Galápagos online.com

Islands of the Galápagos Islands